Beauchampiella is a monotypic genus of rotifers belonging to the family Euchlanidae. The only species is Beauchampiella eudactylota.

The species is found in Central America.

References

Ploima
Rotifer genera
Monotypic animal genera